Pedro Suárez-Vértiz Alva (born February 13, 1969) is a  Peruvian singer-songwriter, and guitarist. He founded the popular rock band Arena Hash with his brother Patricio, Arturo Pomar and Christian Meier in 1987; a few years later, the band broke up and Vértiz began his solo career.

He is the winner of Orgullosamente Latino 2004 (Proudly Latin 2004) and winner of the Best Latin Soloist of the Year in Mexico. 

He is well known for his multitudinous concerts, his vocal rhythm, his extensive guitar collection, his abstinence from alcohol and tobacco, his philanthropy and his personality. In 2020, Billboard magazine named his hit song Globos Del Cielo as the number 14 song of the list of The 25 Timeless Masterpieces of Rock in Spanish.

Biography 

Suárez-Vértiz was born in the "Hospital Naval del Callao", because his mother and his maternal grandfather belonged to the Marina de Guerra del Perú for many years. His younger brother, Patricio Suárez-Vértiz, is also a musician. They spent their whole childhood and adolescence in San Isidro, in front of the Olivar park, which is his favorite park in the world.

Pedro was passionate for the music since he was a little kid. At the age of one, Pedro settled the ornaments of his house down like a xylophone and smacked then with a wand to get melodies out of them. His father immediately bought him an old celesta Dulcitone, Pedro's first musical instrument. Just a few years later, his parents could buy him a piano.

He knew he wanted to be a singer when saw for the first time the movie A Hard Day's Night, in which the famous English band The Beatles appears.

He learned to play the piano and the guitar before he began school. At the age of 18, he attended the University of Lima, graduating with a degree in communications. In 1985 he formed his first band, "Paranoia", together with his brother Patricio Suárez Vértiz and school friends Edward Málaga-Trillo, Arturo Pomar, Eduardo Quevedo and Alex Kornhuber. In 1987, he formed the band Arena Hash with his brother Patricio, Arturo Pomar and Christian Meier. A few years later the band broke up and Vértiz began a solo career.

Since 2011, Pedro has shown an obvious bad diction. He explained that it was consequence of a muscle nerve disorder that developed with the age, also he admitted suffering from chronic Attention deficit hyperactivity disorder which makes him look extremely distracted and tangled speech. This significantly affects his singing.

Discography

With Arena Hash 
 Arena Hash (1987)
 Ah Ah Ah (1991)
 El Archivo De Arena Hash (1995)

Solo career 
 (No Existen) Técnicas para olvidar (1993)
 Póntelo en la lengua (1997)
 Degeneración Actual (1999)
 Anecdotas (2003)
 Play (2004)
 Talkshow (2006)
 Pedro Suárez Vértiz (2007)
 Amazonas (2009)
 Amazonas Uncut (2010)
 Ponerme a Volar (2011)

References

External links
 Official website
 http://scolas.skyrock.com/article_942487856.html
 http://bonnetmedia.com/_wsn/page9.html

1969 births
Living people
21st-century Peruvian male singers
21st-century Peruvian singers
Peruvian guitarists
Male guitarists
People from Callao
Peruvian singer-songwriters
20th-century Peruvian male singers
20th-century Peruvian singers